Jola may refer to:

 Jola people, an ethnic group of West Africa
 Jola languages, a dialect continuum spoken in west Africa
 Jola Jobst (1915–1952), German actress
 Jola Sigmond (born 1943), Swedish architect
 Jola (fungi), a genus of fungi in the order Platygloeales
 Sorghum bicolor, a type of grain

See also
 Johann Lamont, Scottish politician whose name is sometimes abbreviated as JoLa
 Jolas (disambiguation)

Language and nationality disambiguation pages